The Anglican church of Christ Church, Vienna is located in central Vienna, Jaurèsgasse 17-19, off the Rennweg. Worship services are held in English on Sundays and Wednesdays. On the first Sunday of the month there is a service of Evensong (except for July and August).

History
Although there has been an Anglican  priest in Vienna, acting as honorary chaplain to the British ambassador and ministering to the Anglican resident community, at least since the late 17th century, there has only been a permanent building since 1877. Previously services were held in the embassy chapel, from 1831 until 1874 in the Schenkenstraße and later demolished to make way for the new Burgtheater, thereafter in the new purpose-built embassy in the Metternichgasse.
 
From the middle of the 19th century there was a considerable increase in size of the British community living in Vienna, due especially to the establishment of ever more British businesses in Vienna as a result of closer economic ties between the United Kingdom and Austria. Following the building of the new embassy it soon became apparent that an Anglican church in Vienna was also required. The establishment of a permanent place of worship for the British community was proposed to the Austrian Government in 1874 by the British ambassador Sir Andrew Buchanan, but the plan was initially thwarted by a political obstacle.
 
In 1855 Pope Pius IX had concluded a concordat with Austria guaranteeing the prime recognition and privileges of the Roman Catholic Church throughout the Austrian Empire (and thereby maintaining a certain influence on Austrian politics). By 1870, however, following Italian unification, the Vatican had lost most of its temporal power in Italy and was attempting to increase its authority outside its limited sphere. This the Austrian Emperor Franz Joseph objected to, and in 1874 Confessional Laws were passed annulling the Concordat of 1855 and regulating the relations of the Roman Catholic Church with the State.
 
One of these laws limited the right of public worship in the imperial capital to the Roman Catholic Church and the two recognised Protestant Churches: the Augsburg (Lutheran) and the Helvetic (Calvinist) Confessions. Furthermore, there was an absolute condition that the officiating priest must be an Austrian subject. This naturally left the British community in a difficult position although the law did allow members of a non-officially recognised religion (such as the Church of England) the right to private worship. 

There is evidence that the Emperor came to regret the effect these laws had on various foreign communities living in his capital, and especially the British, with whom he was keen to encourage good relations in the hope of wooing the United Kingdom away from her German allegiance. The British ambassador wrote to raise objections to the laws, in particular to the condition on the nationality of the priest, and received the reply that this condition could not be relaxed but that the Austrian Government would not oppose the building of an Anglican church in Vienna by the British residents themselves, so long as it came under the protection and jurisdiction of the British Embassy. In this way the legal impasse could be bypassed, and negotiations began to acquire a plot of land across the road from the newly completed embassy building. In January 1876 the plot was registered as the property of the bishop of London, and building commenced.

Land and architect
The land occupied now by several embassies between the Rennweg and the Neulinggasse was originally owned by the Chancellor Clemens Prince Metternich. Following his death in 1859, his son Richard inherited the whole area including the palace his father had built shortly before his downfall after the liberal revolution of 1848 (since 1908 Italian Embassy). Richard Metternich (the former name of the Jaurèsgasse, Richardgasse, commemorated him) suffered financially in the financial crisis of 1873 and sold his extensive garden to a property developer, who saw the benefits, given the building boom in Vienna at that time following the demolition of the City Walls and construction of the Ringstrasse, of reselling the land divided up into building plots. To add value to his plots he encouraged the Great Powers to move out of the overcrowded Inner City and to create an Embassy District. The British and German Governments were the first to see the advantages of such an investment.
 
The architect Viktor Rumpelmayer (1830–1885) was born in Pressburg (now Bratislava), the son of a stonemason. He studied in Munich and Paris before moving to Vienna in the late 1860s when he worked in the studio of August Sicard von Sicardsburg and Eduard van der Nüll, the architects of the Vienna Opera (completed 1869). In 1872 he set himself up as an independent architect and designed a town palace for Count Sigray on the corner of Reisnerstrasse and Jaurèsgasse (now the Iranian Embassy). This was possibly how he came to the attention of the British ambassador and received the commission to design the new British Embassy. The building, on the corner of the Jaurèsgasse and the Metternichgasse, was begun in 1873 and completed the following year. The French influence on Rumpelmayer's style is very apparent, particularly in the interiors. 
 
To build the new church Rumpelmayer was again chosen as the architect in 1876.
In the meantime the British community had been active raising money for the new church. More than £1000 was raised from British businesses that had exhibited at the World Exhibition held in Vienna in 1873. A commemorative board at the back of the Church lists the main subscribers: these include Queen Victoria and the Prince of Wales, several businessmen and private individuals, as well as a number of Austrians who employed British subjects. The Ambassador and members of the embassy staff also contributed to the fund, as well as the Minister (ambassador) of the United States, indicating the early involvement of American Episcopalians in the existence of Christ Church.
 
In total contrast to his recognised preference for French-influenced Neo-Baroque, Rumpelmayer chose a restrained, sober, more Protestant Gothic style for the church, possibly at the request of the British community (reflecting the taste for Neo-Gothic church building in England at the time), or even for reasons of cost (by reducing added expense for superfluous ornament). The decision to use brick rather than stone was certainly a financial one (for most Viennese building at the time the brick would be covered in stucco to hide the cheapness of the material), but brick too for many would conjure up an image of English architecture. Nevertheless, the bricks were to be handmade, and the stone and woodwork was to be of the highest quality available. The church was also provided with a modern coke-fired heating system, gas lighting and, remarkably for the time, a lavatory.
The character of Christ Church is defined by careful detailing – the pews, the pulpit, the organ loft and particularly the impressive hammer-beam roof – as well as good lofty Gothic proportions. The nave is 18 metres long and 15 metres high to the apex of the roof.
 
Rumpelmayer later adapted his designs for Christ Church, adding a tower and stone cladding, for his Maria Himmelfahrtskirche in Berndorf (Lower Austria), commissioned by the Krupp family and completed in 1883.
 
The church was opened by the Chaplain at that time, the Rev. George Liddel Johnston, on Sunday 8 July 1877 in the presence of the British ambassador at which time the plaque at the back of the church was unveiled proclaiming that the church had been built "in Conformity with an order in Council of His Imperial Majesty Francis Joseph I, permitting the erection of a place of worship in which Divine Service shall be conducted according to The Rites of the Church of England" and stating that "the site is registered as the property of The Right Honourable and Right Reverend The Lord Bishop of London [and] is under the jurisdiction of Her Britannic Majesty's Embassy." At that service, however, no bishop was present, and Christ Church was not officially consecrated until 11 June 1887, possibly because of hitherto outstanding bills for the construction.

Interior

East window

The windows of the church were originally planned to be glazed with plain glass with ornamental geometric tracery. Over the years these were replaced by some modest coloured stained glass panels commemorating worthy members of the resident community. The East Window originally showed Christ the Good Shepherd and was installed to commemorate Queen Victoria's Diamond Jubilee in 1897. All the windows were destroyed at the end of the Second World War. 
The present East Window was designed by Frederick W. Cole, who had served during the war as a captain in the Royal Engineers designing camouflage, but was in fact a member of the Royal Society of Arts and the British Society of Master Glass Painters, and chief designer for the renowned Westminster firm of stained glass-makers William Morris and Co. which made the window.
The Royal Engineers were responsible for repairing the war-damaged church for use as the Garrison Church (including removing shrapnel from the pews and rewiring the church). 
As the inscription at the bottom of the central panel shows, the window is "Dedicated to the Glory of God by the British Troops in Austria 1945-1948". It commemorates the presence of British troops in Austria and the part played by the British 8th Army in the liberation of the country.

Marble relief

A marble relief in the centre of the south wall commemorates Queen Victoria. It was erected after her death in 1901 and is an early example of the work of the sculptor Anton Hanak (1875–1934), whose more typical work can often be seen adorning the façades of Vienna Council tenement blocks of the 1920s.

Organ
The organ was built by the Quebec-based organ builders Létourneau, to replace the original organ of 1897. It was installed in 1987 after the congregation had raised 2 million Austrian Schillings. It is known among organists as a particularly fine instrument, especially for smaller works.

Chaplains
There have been 16 chaplains of Christ Church since its foundation of which two must be mentioned:

William Hechler
The Reverend William Hechler was Chaplain from 1885 to 1910. The son of a German-born missionary to the Jews in Germany and France, Hechler was raised with an intimate knowledge of Jewish tradition and history and developed a passionate belief in prophecies to be found in the Books of the Old Testament. He had previously been tutor to the son of the Grand Duke of Baden, and through this contact this shambling white-bearded eccentric, often wearing a huge cape made with pockets designed to hold Bibles and cushions, became a popular figure in the Courts of Germany. When serving in Vienna, he spent much of his time travelling across the continent lecturing European royalty on the latest archaeological finds from the Holy Land. His study in Vienna became a museum overflowing with archaeological treasures from the Holy Land, models of the Temple and over a thousand rare Bibles. His lifelong interest in the Jewish people complemented his fascination with Bible prophecy and Hechler became convinced that the years 1897-98 would see the return of the Jews to their ancient homeland.

In 1896 he got to know Theodor Herzl, who hoped through Hechler to get access to the German Emperor Wilhelm II, whom Herzl saw as his great hope in establishing the Jewish State. Hechler was indeed able to put Herzl in touch with the Emperor in 1898. Although the meeting gave legitimacy to Herzl's movement, it soon became clear that support would not come from Germany, but one of the results of the Zionist-German contacts was to awaken Britain to the aspirations of the Jewish people. 
Hechler continued to serve as Herzl's adviser, envoy and translator until Herzl's death in 1904. As Herzl's trusted friend and confidant, Hechler was a frequent guest in his home and was the last non-family member to visit him on his deathbed.

Hugh Grimes
The Reverend Hugh Grimes was Chaplain from 1934 until 1938. He too had a fascination for Judaism and soon after his arrival in Vienna he was befriended by a number of Jewish families prominent in the considerable Jewish community of the city. With the arrival of the Germans in Austria in March 1938, Grimes realised the full horrific implication of the annexation for the Jewish population of Vienna. Although many assimilated Viennese Jews, and indeed Grimes himself, failed to grasp at first the full significance of the racial aspect of Nazi policy towards Jews, from the very beginning Grimes felt that he was obliged to help his Jewish friends, despite official British complacency towards the problem. From the day after the Anschluss Grimes began baptising Jews in the belief that an Anglican baptismal certificate would give Jews some sort of – albeit temporary – protection (the Church of England being an established State Church and Christ Church being an Embassy Chapel, and Grimes having diplomatic status), thereby at least gaining time to put their affairs in order before emigrating, or even to enable Jews to obtain transit visas through neighbouring countries.

Over the following weeks word got round the Jewish community and by July 1938 Grimes had baptised some 900 Jews, mostly from the most prominent Viennese Jewish families, holding the hasty ceremonies 6 days a week. In July Grimes returned to London to explain his actions to the suspicious and disapproving authorities, and his place at Christ Church was taken by a retired Anglican priest from Cologne, the Reverend Frederick Collard, who continued the baptisms, sometimes carrying out over 100 a day. In August, the verger of Christ Church, Fred Richter, himself a converted Austrian Jew, was arrested by the Gestapo on the charge of aiding espionage; he had been recruiting spies for the Passport Control Officer at the British Consulate, Capt. Thomas Kendrick, who, as well as issuing visas for the United Kingdom, was also head of British Secret Services on the Continent. Kendrick, the Gestapo's main target, was also arrested. The Gestapo used this opportunity to look into the activities at Christ Church and arrested Collard (who, unlike Grimes, had no diplomatic immunity). He was released, severely shaken, after several days in the notorious Gestapo headquarters, the Hotel Metropole, but went on to carry out another 800 baptisms until he was recalled to Britain in September 1938. In all some 1800 Jews had been baptised. Of these only some 100 did not survive the war years, and most of these were arrested in other countries where they had fled partly through Grimes' and Collard's help.

Fred Richter was used as a scapegoat by the British government to secure Kendrick's release before he revealed too much about the British Secret Service's activities in Europe. He was sentenced by the Germans to 12 years imprisonment for aiding espionage, but was later moved to Auschwitz where he was murdered.

Today 
Today the congregation of Christ Church, Vienna which also serves Klagenfurt, Ljubljana (Slovenia), Zagreb (Croatia) and Bratislava (Slovakia) is a multi-generational, multi-ethnic congregation serving Anglicans from around the world. The church's present Chaplain is the Canon Patrick Curran. He is a member of the Standing Committee of the National Ecumenical Council of Churches in Austria. Christ Church is involved in helping out at a soup kitchen, prison visiting and the keeping of Creationtide. The church also runs a second-hand shop (Salesianergasse 20, Vienna).

References

External links
 Official Website of Christ Church Vienna
 Diocese of Gibraltar in Europe
 Church of England
 Anglican Communion

Churches in Vienna
Anglican church buildings in Europe
Buildings and structures in Landstraße
Diocese in Europe
Protestant churches in Austria
19th-century Anglican church buildings
19th-century churches in Austria
1887 establishments in Austria